Casa de Campo is an administrative neighborhood of Madrid belonging to the district of Moncloa-Aravaca.

Wards of Madrid
Moncloa-Aravaca